Northview is an unincorporated community in Webster County, Missouri, United States. Northview is part of the Springfield, Missouri Metropolitan Statistical Area.

History
Northview was originally called "Bunker Hill", and was platted under that name in 1870. A post office called Bunker was established in 1873, the name was changed to Northview in 1873, and the post office closed in 1973.  The present name is inspired from scenic northerly views from the elevated town site.

Notable people
The oilman, rancher, and philanthropist Joseph Sterling Bridwell of Wichita Falls, Texas, was born in Northview in 1885. Major League Baseball All-Star outfielder and World Series champion Ival Goodman also was born in Northview.

References

Unincorporated communities in Webster County, Missouri
Springfield metropolitan area, Missouri
Unincorporated communities in Missouri